Hilda Petronella Ekroth  (born 12 December 1989) is a Swedish footballer who plays as a defender.

Club career
Ekroth started her football career in the Damallsvenskan playing for Djurgårdens IF.  She followed this with years at  Linköpings FC, AIK, Tyresö FF, Jitex BK, Hammarby IF and Djurgårdens IF.

After spending her entire professional career playing in Sweden, Ekroth signed with Juventus in Italy on July 17, 2018.  Following one year in Italy Ekroth resigned to her former Djurgården on July 10, 2019.

In 2020, Ekroth returned to Hammarby IF in Elitettan, Sweden's second tier, and the club immediately got promoted back to Allsvenskan. Ekroth suffered an anterior cruciate ligament injury that kept her sidelined throughout the whole 2021 season, before she left the club at the end of the year.

International career
Ekroth has represented Sweden in several youth national team levels, gaining over 30 caps in the process.

Personal life
Ekroth's mother Yvonne is a football coach and Ekroth played for her during her time at Djurgården. Her younger brother Oliver Ekroth also plays football, for Swedish club side Degerfors IF in the men's Allsvenskan. Outside of her playing career, Ekroth has worked in football as a commentator and studio analyst for Eurosport.

We Play Strong
Ekroth is one of UEFA's official ambassadors for #WePlayStrong, a social media and vlogging campaign which was launched in 2018. The series, which originally included professional footballers Sarah Zadrazil, Eunice Beckmann, Laura Feiersinger and  Lisa Evans and now also includes Ekroth and Shanice van de Sanden, follows the daily lives of female professional footballers.  The campaign's  "...aim is to promote women’s football as much as we can and to make people aware of women’s football, really,” Evans explains. “The ultimate goal is to make football the most played sport by females by 2020. So it’s a UEFA initiative to get more women and girls playing football, whether they want to be professional or not.”

Honours
Damallsvenskan:
 Champion: 2009,
Supercupen:
 Champion: 2010
Seria A: 
Champion: 2019
Coppa Italia: 
Champion: 2019

References

External links
 
 
 

Swedish women's footballers
AIK Fotboll (women) players
Djurgårdens IF Fotboll (women) players
Damallsvenskan players
1989 births
Living people
Tyresö FF players
Jitex BK players
Hammarby Fotboll (women) players
Linköpings FC players
Women's association football defenders
Juventus F.C. (women) players
21st-century Swedish women